Mahmood Makki Salman Ibrahim Al Bahrani, is a Bahraini politician and businessman. He was sworn in on December 12, 2018 to the Council of Representatives for the twelfth district in the Northern Governorate.

Biography
Al Bahrani graduated from Ahlia University. In 2015, he founded Maskan Real Estate Development Company.

In 2018, he ran for parliament for the twelfth district in the Northern Governorate. In the first round, on November 24, 2018, he won 1,953 votes for 31.90%. This required a second round, which he won with 2,590 votes for 56.49% over Maryam Modon.

References

Bahraini businesspeople
Bahraini politicians
Members of the Council of Representatives (Bahrain)
People from Muharraq
Bahraini Shia Muslims
Living people
Year of birth missing (living people)